Barry Rothbart (born May 25, 1983) is an American comedian, actor and writer. He currently splits his time between Los Angeles and New York City. He was named one of Variety magazine's "10 Comics to Watch" in 2013. He played the role of Peter Deblasio in 2013's The Wolf of Wall Street , played Kevin on ABC's Downward Dog and currently appears on Showtime's Kidding.

Early life 
Rothbart was born in Forest Hills in Queens, New York. He is Jewish.

Rothbart's father was fired from his job for embezzling money, and later bet his life savings on the Red Sox, losing it all in the 1986 World Series, at which his point his mother left his father. As a result, Rothbart said on This Is Not Happening with Ari Shaffir that his father was a bookie for the Gambino Crime Family but claimed to be a music producer. Rothbart would late do random jobs for his father's illegal sports betting office.

Rothbart briefly attended University of Massachusetts Lowell and started doing stand up there. He later transferred to Pace University to study business, but left there after a year to focus on film at Hofstra University. Rothbart then took classes at Upright Citizens Brigade Theatre, before focusing on stand-up. After seven years performing around New York City, he decided to move to Los Angeles.

Career
Rothbart started out in commercials and found some early success there.

In 2011, Rothbart made his stand up television debut on The Tonight Show with Jay Leno. In 2013, he was named one of the "Top Ten Comics to Watch" by Variety magazine.

In 2012, Rothbart landed a role on the revival of Punk'd but was fired after four episodes as a result of his management team leaking he had landed the role.

In 2013 he landed the role of Peter Deblasio in Martin Scorsese's The Wolf of Wall Street. In June 2014, a show he wrote, 300 Sunnyside, was picked up by Comedy Central to air on their fall schedule of that year. Later that year, he released an album, Streets of Fire, on AST Records. He later played Kevin in the new ABC comedy Downward Dog.

Podcasts
Rothbart has hosted or been featured in a number of podcasts.  He hosted Saving The World with Barry and Lucas, a free-flowing conversation about people who want to save the world.  He was a guest on the Shoot This Now Podcast where he tells a story of being a videographer at a nudist colony for gay men over fifty.

Filmography

Films
Who Invited Them (2022)
Vacation Friends (2021)
The Lovebirds (2020)
Happytime Murders (2018)
Dean (2016)
The Wolf of Wall Street (2013)

Television
The Conners (2022)
Kidding (2019)
The 5th Quarter (2018)
Downward Dog (2017)
Single by 30 (2016)
World's Funniest Fails (2015)
@midnight (2015)
Adam DeVine's House Party (2013)
300 Sunnyside (2014)
Late Late Show with Craig Ferguson (2013)
Conan (2012)
Punk'd (2012)
Comedy Central The Half Hour Special (2012)
Men of a Certain Age (2011)
The Tonight Show with Jay Leno (2011)

Discography

Albums
Streets of Fire (2014)

References

External links

1983 births
Living people
American male comedians
American stand-up comedians
American male film actors
American male television actors
People from Forest Hills, Queens
Male actors from New York City
People from Queens, New York
21st-century American male actors
University of Massachusetts Lowell alumni
Comedians from New York City
21st-century American comedians